Bünzau is a river of Schleswig-Holstein, Germany. It flows into the Stör near Sarlhusen.

See also
List of rivers of Schleswig-Holstein

Rivers of Schleswig-Holstein
Rivers of Germany